Castanopsis hypophoenicea is a tree in the family Fagaceae. The specific epithet  is from the Latin (and Greek) meaning "crimson beneath", referring to the indumentum on the leaf underside.

Description
The greyish bark is rough, sometimes smooth.

Distribution and habitat
Castanopsis hypophoenicea is endemic to Borneo. Its habitat is dipterocarp forests up to  altitude.

References

hypophoenicea
Endemic flora of Borneo
Trees of Borneo
Plants described in 1897
Flora of the Borneo lowland rain forests